Gulfport is a village in Henderson County, Illinois, United States. As of the 2010 census, the village population was 54, down from 207 at the 2000 census. It is part of the Burlington, IA–IL Micropolitan Statistical Area. The village was completely submerged, save the roofs of some homes and buildings, by a levee break during the flood of 2008.

Geography
Gulfport is located on the western edge of Henderson County at  (40.808989, −91.083733). It is bordered to the west by the Mississippi River, which is also the state boundary with Iowa. U.S. Route 34 passes through the village, crossing the Mississippi via the Great River Bridge to Burlington, Iowa.

Demographics

As of the census of 2000, there were 207 people, 89 households, and 62 families residing in the village. The racial makeup of the village was 95.65% White, 0.48% Native American, 0.48% Pacific Islander, and 3.38% from two or more races. Hispanic or Latino of any race were 1.45% of the population.

There were 89 households, out of which 22.5% had children under the age of 18 living with them, 55.1% were married couples living together, 7.9% had a female householder with no husband present, and 30.3% were non-families. 23.6% of all households were made up of individuals, and 7.9% had someone living alone who was 65 years of age or older.  The average household size was 2.33 and the average family size was 2.73.

In the village, the population was spread out, with 20.3% under the age of 18, 6.8% from 18 to 24, 29.5% from 25 to 44, 33.8% from 45 to 64, and 9.7% who were 65 years of age or older.  The median age was 42 years. For every 100 females, there were 86.5 males.  For every 100 females age 18 and over, there were 91.9 males.

The median income for a household in the village was $36,167, and the median income for a family was $38,750. Males had a median income of $30,750 versus $21,250 for females. The per capita income for the village was $16,918.  About 5.9% of families and 5.4% of the population were below the poverty line, including 4.9% of those under the age of eighteen and none of those 65 or over.

References

Villages in Henderson County, Illinois
Villages in Illinois
Burlington, Iowa micropolitan area
Illinois populated places on the Mississippi River